Wedding Cake House may refer to:
Wedding Cake House (Kennebunk, Maine)
Wedding Cake House (Providence, Rhode Island)
Wedding Cake House (New Orleans), on St. Charles Avenue, New Orleans, Louisiana